The Republican and Social Action (ARS) was a French parliamentary group in the Chamber of Deputies of France during the French Third Republic between 1919 and 1924 founded by 46 members of the centre-right Democratic Republican Alliance.

Fourth Republic

The name ARS was used by the group formed by 27 Rally of the French People deputies expelled from their party for voting confidence in Antoine Pinay as President of the Council.

See also 
Democratic Republican Alliance
Sinistrisme

Defunct political parties in France
Political parties of the French Third Republic
Parliamentary groups in France
Opportunist Republicans